Andrew Steele (born 19 September 1984 in Didsbury, Manchester) is a British 400 metres and 4x400 m relay runner.

He was educated at St Bede's College, Manchester. He is the son of Dr Chris Steele, the resident health expert on ITV's This Morning.

In 2008, Steele competed in his first Olympic Games – Beijing 2008. He ran a personal best time of 44.94 seconds in reaching the semi-final in the individual 400 m event. As part of the Great Britain team, he finished fourth in the final of the 4x400m relay - 0.6 seconds away from a medal. However, in September 2016 it was confirmed that the Russian team, who had beaten Great Britain to bronze in this race, had been disqualified due to the retesting of Denis Alexeev's urine sample, which tested positive. Consequently, the British team was promoted to the bronze medal position.

Steele spends a few months each spring training at the Australian Institute of Sport, in Canberra.

He is head of product for DNAFit, a DNA testing startup.

Personal bests

All information taken from IAAF profile.

Competition record

References

External links
 
 
 
 

1984 births
Living people
Sportspeople from Manchester
People from Withington
British male sprinters
English male sprinters
Olympic male sprinters
Olympic athletes of Great Britain
Olympic bronze medallists for Great Britain
Olympic bronze medalists in athletics (track and field)
Athletes (track and field) at the 2008 Summer Olympics
Medalists at the 2008 Summer Olympics
Commonwealth Games competitors for England
Athletes (track and field) at the 2006 Commonwealth Games
World Athletics Championships athletes for Great Britain
British Athletics Championships winners
People educated at St Bede's College, Manchester